The Kantonsschule Rämibühl at the Rämistrasse in Zurich, founded in 1832 as "Kantonsschule Zürich" consists of four Kantonsschulen (Sekundarstufe I&II) with different curricular profiles. The four schools, which are attended by more than 2000 students in total, are the Literargymnasium, the Realgymnasium, the Mathematisch-Naturwissenschaftliches Gymnasium and the Kunst- und Sportgymnasium Rämibühl.

The Literargymnasium and the Realgymnasium, which focus on languages and humanities, were the first Swiss state-run schools to offer the International Baccalaureate Diploma Programme. Thus, in grades 9–12, some classes are taught in English (the primary language of the school being German). The Literaturgymnasium also offers extensive courses in Classics including Latin and classical Greek.

The Mathematisch-Naturwissenschaftliches Gymnasium Rämibühl (MNG) is particularly strong in mathematics and science. The school was awarded the MINT (Mathematik, Informatik, Naturwissenschaften und Technik) price for the years 2021 to 2026. The usual duration of attendance is four years. After two years, students decide to focus either on biology & chemistry or physics & applied mathematics as core subjects.

The current school headmaster is Rektor Dr. Daniel Reichmuth. The vice-headmasters (Prorektor) are Susanne Kalt and Samuel Byland.

The Kunst- und Sportgymnasium is attended by students which have a particular talent in arts or sports. It is located in the same building as the MNG.

All the schools support music and thus there exists not only a well-known orchestra but also various school bands as well as a department for individual musical education.They offer private lessons for free for the pupils that choose music as their artistic subject.

Controversy 
In July 2009, the concerned mother of a pupil anonymously filed a civil complaint against German language teacher Daniel Saladin of the Literargymnasium Rämibühl in Zurich, a German scholar, book author and high school teacher. The accusation was that the teacher had excessively exposed his pupils to pornographic literature.  He was arrested, his flat and workplace at school searched, his computers confiscated. The public prosecutor's office of Zurich brought charges of "distributing pornography to minors". "Pornography" here refers to works of world literature that can be borrowed from school libraries and read in class. Among them: Frank Wedekind's Spring Awakening.

References

External links
Literargymnasium
Realgymnasium
Mathematisch-Naturwissenschaftliches Gymnasium 
Kunst und Sportgymasium

Upper secondary schools in the Canton of Zürich
International Baccalaureate schools in Switzerland
Educational institutions established in 1832
Schools in Zürich